Glenda Collins (born 16 December 1943) is an English pop music singer, primarily active in the 1960s.

Recording career
Collins was discovered by Carroll Levis, whose promotion landed her a contract with Decca Records. She released three singles through Decca which failed to chart and was dropped by the label.

Her manager father then recorded some demos with her and introduced her to independent record producer Joe Meek, who took her on.  
Meek featured house bands The Tornados and also The Outlaws featuring the guitarist Ritchie Blackmore on some of her tracks.
 
She released a total of eight singles with Meek, released through the HMV Pop and Pye labels, none of which appeared in the UK Singles Chart. After Meek's suicide in 1967 she recorded sporadically, but his death had effectively put paid to her career; and she retired at the end of the 1960s after a few years on the cabaret circuit.

Collins came out of retirement briefly in 1999 to record a cover version of "Avenues and Alleyways" (The Protectors theme) with record producer Russell C. Brennan (aka Russell C. Writer), which featured on the compilation album, Cult Themes from the 70's, Vol. 2, on Future Legend Records. Her agents were keen to organise a tour.

A 2006 compilation titled This Little Girl's Gone Rockin' contained her complete surviving recorded output.

In 2019, Collins made a second comeback and teamed up again with Brennan once more, as she liked working with him and considered him Meek's successor, to do a new cover of another theme for the last album in the Future Legend Records cult themes series. It was called Cult Themes Forever. This time she recorded "Nobody's Fool" (the theme from Budgie) written by Ray Davies. A full track listing for this 15 track album is available online.

In 2020, Collins did a special recording with Brennan again. This was a unique release as it was co produced by Joe Meek. Utilising a backing track recorded in the 1960s by Meek, Brennan wrote a female slant on the song, "The Long Drop", originally meant for Tony Kaye (aka Tony Grinham). It is released online to coincide with the anniversary of Meek's death on 3 February 2020. The response to the releases were so positive Future Legend Records signed her to a permanent deal, and Brennan is currently producing an album with Collins for a 2022 release. The first single from the album 'Too Sad To Cry was release in March 2022. Prior to that Future Legend Records re-issued her Decca singles with one of the tracks "Find Another Fool", being remixed by Brennan. 
Glenda's long awaited solo album of new tracks called 'Second Chance' came out in December 2022 produced by Russell C. Brennan.and on Future Legend Records, where all her other releases had also featured.

Discography

Singles
"Crazy Guy" / "Take a Chance" (Decca F11280, 1960)
"Oh How I Miss You Tonight" / "Age for Love" (Decca F11321, 1961)
"Head over Heels in Love" / "Find Another Fool" (Decca F11417, 1961)
"I Lost My Heart at the Fairground" / "I Feel So Good" (HMV POP1163, 1963)
"If You've Got to Pick a Baby" / "In the First Place" (HMV POP1233, 1963)
"Baby It Hurts" / "Nice Wasn't It" (HMV POP1283, 1964)
"Lollipop" / "Everybody's Got to Fall in Love" (HMV POP1323, 1964)
"Johnny Loves Me" / "Paradise for Two" (HMV POP1439, 1965)
"Thou Shalt Not Steal" / "Been Invited to a Party" (HMV POP1475, 1965)
"Something I've Got to Tell You" / "My Heart Didn't Lie" (Pye 7N17044, 1966)
"It's Hard to Believe It" / "Don't Let It Rain on Sunday" (Pye 7N17150, 1966)
"The Long Drop" / "Numbers" FLRSGC01 (Future Legend Records, 2020)
"Find Another Fool" (remix) FLRGC02 (Future Legend Records, 2020)
"Too Sad Too Cry" FLRCG04D (Future Legend Records, 2022)

Compilation albums
Cult Themes from the 70's, Vol. 2 ("Avenues & Alleyways" (the Protectors Theme) (Future Legend Records. FLEG.12CD 1999)
This Little Girl's Gone Rockin' (RPM Records UK ASIN B000024URR, 2006)
Cult Themes Forever ("Nobody's Fool" (theme from Budgie) (Future Legend Records) FLEG.37CD (2019)
In The Beginning (7 track EP) Early Decca singles plus remix of "Find Another Fool" (Future Legend Records) (2020)
Second Chance : Glenda's long awaited solo album came out on limited edition CD in December 2022 on Future Legend Records FLR.41CD

References

External links
Future Legend Records: Glenda Collins

1943 births
Living people
Singers from London
English Jews
English women pop singers